The New Zealand budget for fiscal year 2008-2009 was presented to the New Zealand House of Representatives by Finance Minister Dr Michael Cullen on 22 May 2008.

This was the ninth budget Michael Cullen has presented as Minister of Finance, and his last before the Fifth Labour Government was defeated at the 2008 general election.

Outline 
The New Zealand economy went into recession in the last quarter of 2007, putting significant strain on the Government's accounts.

Tax changes 
The 2008 budget reduced income tax on the first $9,500 earned from 15% to 12.5%, and the company tax rate from 30% to 29%.

References

External links 
 New Zealand Herald, 2008 Budget coverage

Budget, 2008
New Zealand budgets
New Zealand budget
May 2008 events in New Zealand